Spring Hill is an unincorporated community in Choctaw County, Alabama, United States.

References

Unincorporated communities in Choctaw County, Alabama
Unincorporated communities in Alabama